The year 1938 in film involved some significant events.

Top-grossing films (U.S.)
The top ten 1938 released films by box office gross in North America are as follows:

Events
January – MGM announces that Judy Garland will be cast in the role of Dorothy Gale in the upcoming The Wizard of Oz film. Ray Bolger is cast as the Tin Woodman and Buddy Ebsen as the Scarecrow. At Bolger's insistence, the roles are switched between the two actors. On July 25, MGM announces Bert Lahr has been cast as the Cowardly Lion.
February 24 – The entertainment trade newspaper Variety confirms that the film studio Metro-Goldwyn-Mayer (MGM) had bought the rights to adapt L. Frank Baum’s beloved children’s novel The Wonderful Wizard of Oz for the screen
April 5 – Noel Langley completes the first script for The Wizard of Oz.
April 20 – Leonard Slye appears in his first starring role as Roy Rogers in Under Western Stars. He becomes one of the most popular Western stars being ranked number one from 1943 to 1952 and would become known as "King of the Cowboys".
May 7 – Lyricist Yip Harburg and composer Harold Arlen , begin work on the musical score for The Wizard of Oz.
October 13 – Filming starts on The Wizard of Oz on the Metro-Goldwyn-Mayer studio lot in Culver City, California, initially with Richard Thorpe as director.
October 21 – Buddy Ebsen suffers from a near fatal allergic reaction to the aluminum dust used in his Tin Woodman make-up on the set of The Wizard of Oz. Ebsen is replaced by Jack Haley.
December 23 – Margaret Hamilton is severely burned during a mishap on the set of The Wizard of Oz. Hamilton, cast in the role of the Wicked Witch of the West, leaves the film for six weeks.
Orson Welles makes Too Much Johnson, starring Joseph Cotten. It is never completed and first released only in 2013.
 Producer George Minter establishes Renown Pictures, a British film distributor.

Academy Awards

 Best Picture: You Can't Take It with You – Columbia
 Best Director: Frank Capra – You Can't Take It with You
 Best Actor: Spencer Tracy – Boys Town
 Best Actress: Bette Davis – Jezebel
 Best Supporting Actor: Walter Brennan – Kentucky
 Best Supporting Actress: Fay Bainter – Jezebel

1938 film releases

January–March
January 1938
January 6
In Old Chicago
March 1938
March 26
Jezebel

April–June
April 1938
April 7
The Adventures of Marco Polo
April 22
Test Pilot
May 1938
May 12
The Adventures of Robin Hood
June 1938
June 2
Three Comrades

July–September
July 1938
July 8
Marie Antoinette
August 1938
August 5
Alexander's Ragtime Band
August 9
Four Daughters
September 1938
September 9
Boys Town
September 16
Too Hot to Handle
September 29
You Can't Take It with You

October–December

October 1938
October 14
Young Dr. Kildare
November 1938
November 11
If I Were King
December 1938
December 30
Sweethearts

Notable films released in 1938
United States unless stated

A
Adiós Buenos Aires – (Argentina/Spain/Canada)
The Adventures of Marco Polo, starring Gary Cooper and Basil Rathbone
The Adventures of Robin Hood, directed by Michael Curtiz, starring Errol Flynn, Olivia de Havilland, Basil Rathbone
The Adventures of Tom Sawyer, directed by Norman Taurog
Águila o sol (Heads or Tails), starring Cantinflas – (Mexico)
Alexander Nevsky, directed by Sergei Eisenstein, starring Nikolai Cherkasov – (U.S.S.R.)
Alexander's Ragtime Band, starring Tyrone Power, Don Ameche, Alice Faye
Algiers, starring Charles Boyer and Hedy Lamarr
The Amazing Dr. Clitterhouse, starring Edward G. Robinson
Angels with Dirty Faces, starring James Cagney, Pat O'Brien, Humphrey Bogart

B
Bank Holiday, starring Margaret Lockwood – (GB)
La Bête humaine (The Human Beast), directed by Jean Renoir, starring Jean Gabin and Simone Simon – (France)
The Big Broadcast of 1938, starring W.C. Fields, Martha Raye, Bob Hope, Dorothy Lamour
Billy the Kid Returns, starring Stan Laurel and Oliver Hardy
Block-Heads, starring Stan Laurel and Oliver Hardy
Blondie, starring Penny Singleton
Bluebeard's Eighth Wife, starring Gary Cooper and Claudette Colbert
Boys Town, starring Spencer Tracy and Mickey Rooney
Bringing Up Baby, directed by Howard Hawks, starring Cary Grant and Katharine Hepburn – number 14 on the American Film Institute list of best comedy films
The Buccaneer, directed by Cecil B. DeMille, starring Fredric March

C
Carefree, starring Fred Astaire and Ginger Rogers
Carmen, la de Triana (Carmen, the girl from Triana) – (Spain/Germany)
Charlie Chan in Honolulu, starring Sidney Toler
A Christmas Carol, starring Reginald Owen
The Citadel, directed by King Vidor, starring Robert Donat and Rosalind Russell – (GB)
Climbing High, starring Michael Redgrave and Jessie Matthews – (GB)
Cocoanut Grove, starring Fred MacMurray
College Swing, starring George Burns, Gracie Allen, Martha Raye, Bob Hope
Convict 99, starring Will Hay – (GB)
Crime School, starring The Dead End Kids and Humphrey Bogart
The Crowd Roars, starring Robert Taylor and Maureen O'Sullivan

D
Dangerous to Know, starring Anna May Wong and Akim Tamiroff
The Dawn Patrol, starring Errol Flynn
Diao Chan – (China)
The Divorce of Lady X, with Laurence Olivier and Merle Oberon – (GB)
The Drum, with Sabu and Raymond Massey – (GB)
Ducháček Will Fix It (Ducháček to zařídí) – (Czechoslovakia)

F
La Femme du Boulanger (The Baker's Wife), directed by Marcel Pagnol, starring Raimu – (France)
Ferdinand the Bull, a Disney animated short
Fools for Scandal, starring Carole Lombard
The Four Companions, directed by Carl Froelich, starring Ingrid Bergman (Germany)
Four Daughters, starring Claude Rains
Four Men and a Prayer, directed by John Ford, starring Loretta Young, Richard Greene, David Niven
Four's a Crowd, starring Errol Flynn, Olivia de Havilland, Rosalind Russell, Patric Knowles

G
The Gaunt Stranger, starring Sonnie Hale – (GB)
The Girl of the Golden West, starring Jeanette MacDonald and Nelson Eddy

H
Hard to Get, starring Olivia de Havilland and Dick Powell
Having Wonderful Time, starring Ginger Rogers and Douglas Fairbanks Jr.
Her Jungle Love, starring Dorothy Lamour and Ray Milland
Here's Flash Casey, starring Eric Linden, Boots Mallory, and Cully Richards
Holiday, starring Katharine Hepburn and Cary Grant
Honeysuckle, starring Hugo del Carril and Libertad Lamarque (Argentina)
Hotel du Nord, directed by Marcel Carné – (France)

I
I Am the Law, starring Edward G. Robinson
If I Were King, starring Ronald Colman
In Old Chicago, starring Tyrone Power, Alice Faye, Don Ameche
Inspector Hornleigh, starring Gordon Harker and Alastair Sim – (GB)
International Settlement, starring Dolores del Río

J
J'accuse!, directed by Abel Gance – (France)
Jezebel, starring Bette Davis and Henry Fonda
Judge Hardy's Children, starring Lewis Stone, Mickey Rooney, Cecilia Parker, Fay Holden
Just Around the Corner, starring Shirley Temple

K
Kentucky, starring Loretta Young, Richard Greene, Walter Brennan
Kentucky Moonshine, starring the Ritz Brothers
Kidnapped, starring Warner Baxter and Freddie Bartholomew
Kilómetro 111 – (Argentina)
King Kong Appears in Edo (Edo ni Arawareta Kingu Kongu) – (Japan)

L
The Lady Vanishes, directed by Alfred Hitchcock, starring Michael Redgrave and Margaret Lockwood – (GB)
Listen, Darling, starring Judy Garland and Freddie Bartholomew
Little Miss Broadway, starring Shirley Temple, Jimmy Durante, Edna May Oliver
Little Tough Guy, starring Robert Wilcox, Helen Parrish, Marjorie Main
Lord Jeff, starring Freddie Bartholomew and Mickey Rooney 
Love Finds Andy Hardy, starring Lewis Stone, Mickey Rooney, Judy Garland, Cecilia Parker, Fay Holden

M
Mad About Music, starring Deanna Durbin and Herbert Marshall
The Mad Miss Manton, starring Barbara Stanwyck and Henry Fonda
A Man to Remember, starring Anne Shirley and Edward Ellis
Marie Antoinette, starring Norma Shearer and Tyrone Power
Men with Wings, directed by William Wellman, starring Fred MacMurray and Ray Milland
Merrily We Live, starring Brian Aherne, Constance Bennett, Billie Burke, Patsy Kelly
Mollenard, directed by Robert Siodmak – (France)
Mother Carey's Chickens, starring Anne Shirley 
The Mountain Calls (Der Berg Ruft) – (Germany)
Mr. Moto's Gamble, starring Peter Lorre and Keye Luke
Mr. Wong, Detective, starring Boris Karloff
My Bill, starring Kay Francis, Dickie Moore

O
Of Human Hearts, starring Walter Huston, James Stewart, Beulah Bondi
Old Bones of the River, starring Will Hay, Moore Marriott, Graham Moffatt – (GB)
Olympia, a documentary by Leni Riefenstahl – (Germany)
Out West with the Hardys, starring Lewis Stone, Mickey Rooney, Cecilia Parker, Fay Holden

P
Paradise for Three, starring Frank Morgan, Robert Young, Mary Astor
Paweł i Gaweł (Pawel and Gawel) – (Poland)
Port of Seven Seas, directed by James Whale, starring Wallace Beery and Maureen O'Sullivan
Port of Shadows (Le quai des brumes), directed by Marcel Carné, starring Jean Gabin and Michel Simon – (France)
Prison Break, starring Barton MacLane and Glenda Farrell
Professor Beware, starring Harold Lloyd
Professor Mamlock – (U.S.S.R.)
Pygmalion, directed by Anthony Asquith, starring Leslie Howard and Wendy Hiller – (GB)

R
Radio City Revels, starring Jack Oakie
Rawhide, starring Lou Gehrig, Smith Ballew, and Evalyn Knapp
Rebecca of Sunnybrook Farm, starring Shirley Temple
Red River Range, starring John Wayne
Room Service, starring the Marx Brothers and Lucille Ball

S
The Saint in New York, starring Louis Hayward
Save a Little Sunshine, starring Patricia Kirkwood and Tommy Trinder – (GB)
The Shopworn Angel, starring James Stewart and Margaret Sullavan
Sing You Sinners, starring Bing Crosby, Fred MacMurray, Ellen Drew, Donald O'Connor
Sidewalks of London, starring Charles Laughton, Vivien Leigh, Rex Harrison – (GB)
The Sisters, starring Errol Flynn and Bette Davis
Sixty Glorious Years, starring Anna Neagle – (GB)
Škola základ života – (Czechoslovakia)
A Slight Case of Murder, starring Edward G. Robinson
Suez, starring Tyrone Power and Loretta Young
Sweethearts, starring Jeanette MacDonald and Nelson Eddy

T
The Terror of Tiny Town, starring Billy Curtis 
Test Pilot, starring Clark Gable and Myrna Loy
That Certain Age, starring Deanna Durbin and Melvyn Douglas
There Goes My Heart, starring Fredric March, Virginia Bruce and Patsy Kelly
They Drive by Night, starring Emlyn Williams and Ernest Thesiger – (GB)
Three Comrades, starring Robert Taylor, Margaret Sullavan, Franchot Tone
Tom Sawyer, Detective, starring Donald O'Connor
Too Hot to Handle, starring Clark Gable and Myrna Loy

U-V
Urlaub auf Ehrenwort (Leave on Parole) – (Germany)
Valley of the Giants, starring Wayne Morris and Claire Trevor
Young Fugitives, starring Harry Davenport
Vivacious Lady, starring Ginger Rogers and James Stewart
Volga-Volga – (U.S.S.R.)

W
We're Going to Be Rich – starring Gracie Fields, Victor McLaglen and Brian Donlevy – (GB)
White Banners, starring Claude Rains and Fay Bainter
A Woman's Face (En kvinnas ansikte), starring Ingrid Bergman – (Sweden)
Woman Against Woman, starring Herbert Marshall and Virginia Bruce

Y
A Yank at Oxford, starring Robert Taylor, Lionel Barrymore, Vivien Leigh – (GB)
You Can't Take It with You, directed by Frank Capra, starring James Stewart, Jean Arthur, Lionel Barrymore – Oscars for best picture and director
Young Dr. Kildare, starring Lew Ayres and Lionel Barrymore
The Young in Heart, starring Janet Gaynor, Douglas Fairbanks, Jr., Paulette Goddard

Z
La Zandunga, starring Lupe Vélez and Arturo de Córdova – (Mexico)

Serials
Dick Tracy Returns, starring Ralph Byrd
The Fighting Devil Dogs, starring Lee Powell and Herman Brix
Flaming Frontiers
Flash Gordon's Trip to Mars, starring Buster Crabbe
The Great Adventures of Wild Bill Hickok
Hawk of the Wilderness, starring Herman Brix
The Lone Ranger
The Secret of Treasure Island
The Spider's Web
Red Barry

Comedy film series
Harold Lloyd (1913–1938)
Charlie Chaplin (1914–1940)
Lupino Lane (1915–1939)
Buster Keaton (1917–1944)
Laurel and Hardy (1921–1945)
Our Gang (1922–1944)
Marx Brothers (1929–1937)
The Three Stooges (1934–1959)

Animated short film series
Krazy Kat (1925–1940)
Oswald the Lucky Rabbit (1927-1938)
Mickey Mouse (1928–1953)
Silly Symphonies
 The Moth and the Flame
 Wynken, Blynken and Nod
 Farmyard Symphony
 Merbabies
 Mother Goose Goes Hollywood
Screen Songs (1929-1938)
Looney Tunes (1930–1969)
Terrytoons (1930–1964)
Merrie Melodies (1931–1969)
Scrappy (1931–1941)
Betty Boop (1932–1939)
Popeye (1933–1957)
Happy Harmonies (1934-1938)
Color Rhapsodies (1934–1949)
Donald Duck (1937–1956)
Walter Lantz Cartunes (also known as New Universal Cartoons or Cartune Comedies) (1938–1942)
The Captain and the Kids (1938–1939)

Births
January 1 – Frank Langella, American actor
January 3 – Tom Bower, American actor
January 4 – Jim Norton, Irish character actor
January 6 – Larisa Shepitko, Soviet director (died 1979)
January 8 – Bob Eubanks, American television personality and game show host
January 9 – Nobuhiko Obayashi, Japanese filmmaker (died 2020)
January 12 – Lewis Fiander, Australian actor (died 2016)
January 13 
 William B. Davis, Canadian actor
 Billy Gray, American actor
January 14 – Jack Jones, American singer, actor
January 21 – Doug Lennox, Canadian actor and writer (died 2015)
January 26 – Henry Jaglom, English-born director and playwright
January 29 – Aminah Cendrakasih, Indonesian actress (died 2022)
February 2 – Bo Hopkins, American actor (died 2022)
February 3
Marshall Efron, American actor (died 2019)
John Mahon (actor), American actor (died 2020)
February 12 – Oliver Reed, English actor (died 1999)
February 17 – Yvonne Romain, English actress
February 19 – René Muñoz, Cuban-born actor, Mexico-based screenwriter (died 2000)
February 20 – Richard Beymer, American actor and film maker
February 22 – Karin Dor, German actress (died 2017)
February 23
Jiří Menzel, Czech director (died 2020)
Diane Varsi, American actress (died 1992)
February 24
James Farentino, American actor (died 2012)
Robert A. Silverman, Canadian actor
February 25
Diane Baker, American actress and producer
Malcolm Tierney, English actor (died 2014)
March 4 – Paula Prentiss, American actress
March 5 – Fred Williamson, American actor
March 9 – Charles Siebert, American actor and television director (died 2022)
March 18 – Shashi Kapoor, Indian actor (died 2017)
March 25 – Hoyt Axton, American country music singer-songwriter, actor (died 1999)
April 2 – Hans-Michael Rehberg, German actor (died 2017)
April 6 – Roy Thinnes, American actor
April 15 – Claudia Cardinale, Italian actress
May 5 – Michael Murphy (actor), American actor
May 6 – Hartmut Becker, German actor (died 2022)
May 12 
Luana Anders, American actress (died 1996)
Millie Perkins, American actress
May 13 – Buck Taylor, American actor
May 17 – Jason Bernard, American actor (died 1996)
May 19 – Bryan Marshall, British actor (died 2019)
May 22
Richard Benjamin, American actor, director
Frank Converse, American actor
John Nolan, British actor
May 24 – Tommy Chong, Canadian-American actor, writer, director, musician and comedian
June 7 – Ann Beach, British actress (died 2017)
June 12 – Tom Oliver, Australian actor
June 16 – Michael Culver, English actor
June 18 – Michael Sheard, Scottish actor (died 2005)
June 21
Ron Ely, American actor
Celia Rodriguez, Filipina actress
June 25 – Giampiero Littera, Italian actor
June 27 – Kathryn Beaumont, English-American actress and singer
July 6 – Luana Patten, American actress (died 1996)
July 8 – Andrey Myagkov, Soviet/Russian actor (died 2021)
July 9 – Brian Dennehy, American actor (died 2020)
July 11 – Jiří Krampol, Czech actor
July 18 – Paul Verhoeven, Dutch director
July 20 
Diana Rigg, English actress (died 2020)
Natalie Wood, American actress (died 1981)
July 22 – Terence Stamp, English actor
July 23 – Ronny Cox, American actor, singer-songwriter
July 25 – Pilar Seurat, Philippine-American actress (died 2001)
July 27 - Danielle De Metz, French actress
July 30 – Michael Bell, American actor
August 6
Paul Bartel, American actor, writer and director (died 2000)
Peter Bonerz, American actor and director
August 8 – Connie Stevens, American actress, singer
August 9 – Burton Gilliam, American actor
August 15
Ron Dean, American actor
Lucille Soong, Chinese-American actress
August 19 – Diana Muldaur, American actress
August 26 – Susan Harrison, American actress (died 2019)
August 29 – Elliott Gould, American actor
September 2
 Clarence Felder, American actor
 Giuliano Gemma, Italian actor (died 2013)
 Mary Jo Catlett, American actress
September 8 – Philip L. Clarke, American voice actor (died 2013)
September 12 – Michael Leader, English actor (died 2016)
September 26 – Jonathan Goldsmith, American character actor
September 28 – Ben E. King, American soul singer (died 2015)
October 1
 Tunç Başaran, Turkish screenwriter, film director, film producer and actor (died 2019)
 Tony Darrow, Italian-American actor
 Stella Stevens, American actress (died 2023)
October 2 – Rex Reed, American film critic and "actor"
October 4 – Loretta Long, American actress, voice artist and singer
October 10 – Steve Gordon, American filmmaker (died 1982)
October 13 – Christiane Hörbiger, Austrian actress  (died 2022)
October 18 – Dawn Wells, American actress (died 2020)
October 22
Derek Jacobi, English actor and director
Christopher Lloyd, American actor
October 30 – Ed Lauter, American actor and stand-up comedian (died 2013)
November 13 – Jean Seberg, American actress (died 1979)
November 20 - Dick Smothers, American actor, comedian, composer and musician
November 26 – Rich Little, Canadian-American voice actor
November 28 – Michael Ritchie, American director, producer and writer (died 2001)
December 6 – Patrick Bauchau, Belgian actor
December 12 - Leslie Schofield, English actor
December 14 – Hal Williams, American actor
December 16
Neil Connery, Scottish actor (died 2021)
Liv Ullmann, Norwegian actress
December 18 – Roger E. Mosley, American actor, director and writer (died 2022)
December 21 – Larry Bryggman, American actor
December 29 – Jon Voight, American actor

Deaths
January 19 – Robert McWade, 65, American actor, The Kennel Murder Case, The Dragon Murder Case, Cappy Ricks Returns, Mr. Cinderella
January 20 – Émile Cohl, 81, French film pioneer
January 21 – Georges Méliès, 76, French film pioneer, The Impossible Voyage, A Trip to the Moon, The Merry Frolics of Satan, The Conquest of the Pole
January 26 – Matthew Betz, 56, American actor, The Wedding March, The Patent Leather Kid, The Big House, The Hurricane Express
August 4 – Pearl White, 49, American silent film star, The Perils of Pauline, The Exploits of Elaine
August 6 – Warner Oland, 58, Swedish-born actor, The Jazz Singer, Shanghai Express, Charlie Chan in London, Charlie Chan at the Opera
September 19 – Pauline Frederick, 55, American stage & film actress, Thank You, Mr. Moto, Smouldering Fires, This Modern Age, Devil's Island
October 1 – Conway Tearle, 60, American stage & film actor, The Hurricane Express, Romeo and Juliet, Stella Maris, The Lost Zeppelin
December 25 – Harry Myers, 56, American film actor and director, City Lights, Baby
December 28 – Florence Lawrence, 48, Canadian actress, Hollywood's first "star", Lady Helen's Escapade, The Taming of the Shrew, The Mended Lute, Betrayed by a Handprint

Debuts
Eddie Albert – Brother Rat
Peter Finch – Dad and Dave Come to Town
June Foray - Boy Meets Dog
John Garfield – Swingtime in the Movies
William Holden – Prison Farm
Lena Horne – The Duke is Tops
Glynis Johns – South Riding
June Lockhart – A Christmas Carol
Maureen O'Hara – Kicking the Moon Around
Vincent Price – Service de Luxe
Michael Redgrave – The Lady Vanishes

References 

 
Film by year